Ralph Micheli is a former American football coach. He served as the head football coach at Tarkio College in Tarkio, Missouri from 1978 to 1980, Sul Ross State University in Alpine, Texas from 1985 to 1981, and Minnesota State University Moorhead from 1993 to 2004, compiling a career college football coaching record of 85–131–4.  Micheli played college football at Macalester College.

Head coaching record

College

References

Year of birth missing (living people)
Living people
Arkansas Razorbacks football coaches
Macalester Scots football players
Minnesota State–Moorhead Dragons football coaches
Sul Ross Lobos football coaches
Tarkio Owls football coaches
High school football coaches in Indiana
University of Arkansas alumni
Sportspeople from Hammond, Indiana
Players of American football from Indiana